Philipp Müllner (born 11 April 1980) is an Austrian former professional tennis player.

Müllner reached a career high singles ranking of 329 in the world and won four ITF Futures titles. His best performance on the ATP Challenger Tour came at the 2003 Tehran Challenger, where he made the singles semi-finals and won the doubles event, partnering Daniel Köllerer.

Challenger/Futures titles

Singles: (4)

Doubles: (3)

References

External links
 
 

1980 births
Living people
Austrian male tennis players